Randy Formemtera Petalcorin (born 31 December 1991) is a Filipino professional boxer who held the WBA interim light-flyweight title from 2014 to 2015. He has challenged twice for light-flyweight world championships; the IBF title in 2018 and the WBC title in 2019.

Professional career 

Petalcorin fights in the light-flyweight division and was dubbed "Ultra Tune" when sponsored by the Australian car service franchise He fought in Melbourne, Australia on Peter Maniatis events between 2013 and 2017, training at the Boxingfit Gym in Port Melbourne.

He won the WBA interim light-flyweight title against Walter Tello via seventh-round technical knockout in Shanghai, China, in front of 15,000 strong crowd on a Top Rank promoted card with Hall of Fame promoter Bob Arum ringside. Audience member, fellow Filipino boxer Manny Pacquiao , jumped into the ring when Petalcorin won the WBA interim title to congratulate him.

Petalcorin trained in Melbourne using a high altitude training scheme with his co-sponsors Altitude Services, led by Rod Cedaro.

On 24 April 2015 in Beijing, he won his title fight against Ma Yi Ming by first-round knockout at 1 minute and 45 seconds.

On 10 November 2017 Randy won his fight in the first round by knockout against Oscar Raknafa at Malvern Town Hall in Melbourne.

Professional boxing record

| style="text-align:center;" colspan="8"|29 Wins (22 knockouts, 6 decisions, 1 disqualification), 3 Loss, 1 Draw
|-  style="text-align:center; background:#e3e3e3;"
|  style="border-style:none none solid solid; "|Res.	
|  style="border-style:none none solid solid; "|Record
|  style="border-style:none none solid solid; "|Opponent
|  style="border-style:none none solid solid; "|Type
|  style="border-style:none none solid solid; "|Round, Time
|  style="border-style:none none solid solid; "|Date
|  style="border-style:none none solid solid; "|Location
|  style="border-style:none none solid solid; "|Notes
|- align=center
|Loss
|29–3–1
|align=left| Felix Alvarado		
|
|
|29 Oct 2018
|align=left|
|align=left|
|- align=center
|Win
|29–2–1
|align=left| Jade Yagahon		
|
|
|19 May 2018
|align=left|
|align=left|
|- align=center
|Win
|28–2–1
|align=left| Oscar Raknafa		
|
|
|10 Nov 2017
|align=left|
|align=left|
|- align=center
|Win
|27–2–1
|align=left| Jetly Purisima	
|
|
|9 Sep 2017
|align=left|
|align=left|
|- align=center
|Win
|26–2–1
|align=left| Mark Anthony Florida
|
|
|26 Feb 2017
|align=left|
|align=left|
|- align=center
|Win
|25–2–1
|align=left| Arnold Garde
|
|
|4 Dec 2016
|align=left|
|align=left|
|- align=center
|Win
|24–2–1
|align=left| Donny Mabao
|
|
|27 Sep 2016
|align=left|
|align=left|
|- align=center
|Loss
|23–2–1
|align=left| Omari Kimweri
|
|
|15 Apr 2016
|align=left|
|align=left|
|- align=center
|Win
|23–1–1
|align=left| Ma Yiming
|
|
|24 Apr 2015
|align=left|
|align=left|
|- align=center
|Win
|22–1–1
|align=left| Walter Tello
|
|
|26 Aug 2014
|align=left|
|align=left|
|- align=center
|Win
|21–1–1
|align=left| Samransak Singmanasak
|
|
|28 Mar 2014
|align=left|
|align=left|
|- align=center
|Win
|20–1–1
|align=left| Samransak Singmanasak
|
|
|8 Nov 2013
|align=left|
|align=left|
|- align=center
|style="background: #B0C4DE"| Draw
|19–1–1
|align=left| Rene Patilano
|
|
|16 Feb 2013
|align=left|
|align=left|
|- align=center
|Win
|19–1
|align=left| Jovel Romasasa
|
|
|8 Dec 2012
|align=left|
|align=left|
|- align=center
|Win
|18–1
|align=left| Michael Bastasa
|
|
|30 Sep 2012
|align=left|
|align=left|
|- align=center
|Win
|17–1
|align=left| Wittawas Basapean
|
|
|21 Apr 2012
|align=left|
|align=left|
|- align=center
|Win
|16–1
|align=left| Jherald Tuyor
|
|
|23 Oct 2011
|align=left|
|align=left|
|- align=center
|Win
|15–1
|align=left| Arnel Tadena
|
|
|24 Sep 2011
|align=left|
|align=left|
|- align=center
|Win
|14–1
|align=left| Michael Rodriguez
|
|
|6 Aug 2011
|align=left|
|align=left|
|- align=center
|Win
|13–1
|align=left| Yodchingchai Sithkonnapha
|
|
|11 Jun 2011
|align=left|
|align=left|
|- align=center
|Win
|12–1
|align=left| Juanito Tumugsok
|
|
|25 Apr 2011
|align=left|
|align=left|
|- align=center
|Win
|11–1
|align=left| Rogen Flores
|
|
|26 Feb 2011
|align=left|
|align=left|
|- align=center
|Win
|10–1
|align=left| Allan Doronilla
|
|
|4 Dec 2010
|align=left|
|align=left|
|- align=center
|Win
|9–1
|align=left| Rey Morano
|
|
|6 Oct 2010
|align=left|
|align=left|
|- align=center
|Win
|8–1
|align=left| Charlie Cabilla
|
|
|5 Sep 2010
|align=left| 
|align=left|
|- align=center
|Win
|7–1
|align=left| Allan Doronilla
|
|
|23 Jul 2010
|align=left|
|align=left|
|- align=center
|Win
|6–1
|align=left| Michael Bastasa
|
|
|15 Jul 2010
|align=left|
|align=left|
|- align=center
|Loss
|5–1
|align=left| Marlon Tapales
|
|
|23 Jan 2010
|align=left|
|align=left|
|- align=center
|Win
|5–0
|align=left| Ricardo Claveria
|
|
|31 Oct 2009
|align=left|
|align=left|
|- align=center
|Win
|4–0
|align=left| Wennie Bartiquel
|
|
|3 Sep 2009
|align=left|
|align=left|
|- align=center
|Win
|3–0
|align=left| Jherom Tuyor
|
|
|27 Jul 2009
|align=left|
|align=left|
|- align=center
|Win
|2–0
|align=left| Rolando Palac
|
|
|28 May 2009
|align=left|
|align=left|
|- align=center
|Win
|1–0
|align=left| Sherwin McDo Lungay
|
|
|28 Mar 2009
|align=left|
|align=left|

See also 
List of Filipino boxing world champions
List of WBA world champions
List of light-flyweight boxing champions

References

External links
 

|-

1991 births
Living people
Sportspeople from Davao City
Boxers from Davao del Sur
Filipino male boxers
Flyweight boxers